Meng Lili (born December 28, 1979, in Xintai, Tai'an, Shandong) is a female Chinese freestyle wrestler who competed at the 2004 Summer Olympics.

She finished ninth in the 63 kg freestyle competition.

External links
profile

1979 births
Living people
Chinese female sport wrestlers
Olympic wrestlers of China
People from Tai'an
Wrestlers at the 2004 Summer Olympics
Sportspeople from Shandong
21st-century Chinese women